Wesley Fofana may refer to:
Wesley Fofana (rugby union) (born 1988), French rugby union footballer
Wesley Fofana (footballer) (born 2000), French footballer